Brilliant! was a group exhibition of contemporary art held at the Walker Art Center, Minneapolis, USA between 22 October 1995 and 7 January 1996. The exhibition then traveled to the Contemporary Arts Museum Houston, Texas - where it was on view between 17 February and 14 April 1996.

Theme and content
The exhibition sought to showcase a burgeoning group of English artists now known as the YBAs. The Walker's press material, defining the criteria for selection of artists in the exhibition, says:

The artists chosen for the exhibition have become increasingly visible over the past six years in self-promoted, renegade exhibitions and publications that have cropped up throughout London. Their aesthetically diverse and provocative artworks are united by a shared interest in ephemeral materials, unconventional presentation, and an anti-authoritarian stance that lends their objects a youthful, aggressive vitality.

Exhibited artists

 Henry Bond
 Glenn Brown
 Jake and Dinos Chapman
 Adam Chodzko
 Mat Collishaw
 Tracey Emin
 Angus Fairhurst
 Anya Gallaccio
 Liam Gillick
 Damien Hirst
 Gary Hume
 Michael Landy
 Abigail Lane
 Sarah Lucas
 Chris Ofili
 Steven Pippin
 Alessandro Raho
 Georgina Starr
 Sam Taylor-Wood
 Gillian Wearing
 Rachel Whiteread

References

External links
 Curator Richard Flood bio.

Contemporary art exhibitions
Young British Artists